Cold Water is a 1994 French film written and directed by Olivier Assayas about two troubled teenagers in France during the 1970s. The film was screened in the Un Certain Regard section at the 1994 Cannes Film Festival.

In October, 2007, it was screened at the Pacific Film Archive in Berkeley, California, where Assayas spent a week in residence introducing and discussing his films with the audiences there. He was accompanied by his friend Jean-Michel Frodon, the current director of the journal Cahiers du cinéma, of which Assayas was once the director. Assayas said the film is autobiographical, reflecting upon his own teenage years. He went out of his way to cast actors who were not professionals or who, as in the case of male lead Cyprien Fouquet (playing Gilles), had never acted before, although female lead Virginie Ledoyen (playing Christine) had appeared in several films. The film was the result of a commission from French TV, which wanted a 52-minute film but allowed Assayas to make a longer version, after some negotiations.

Plot
Gilles and Christine are teenagers from unstable homes. When they do some shop-lifting together she is arrested, but he gets away. She escapes from a mental institution and meets him at an abandoned house in the country, where a large group of rebellious teenagers are having a wild, all-night party. American rock music from the period is played prominently and has a very strong effect, especially "Me and Bobby McGee," sung by Janis Joplin. Drugs are used, mainly pot and hash. As the party is winding down, Gilles and Christine escape even deeper into the countryside, searching for a commune where artists are said to live without electricity or running water. This is Christine's idea, but Gilles reluctantly goes along. A jolting conclusion shows us that, as Assayas puts it, "Gilles' real life has now begun."

Cast
 Virginie Ledoyen - Christine
 Cyprien Fouquet - Gilles
 László Szabó - Gilles's father
 Jean-Pierre Darroussin - Inspector
 Jackie Berroyer - Christine's father
 Dominique Faysse - Christine's mother
 Smaïl Mekki - Mourad
 Jean-Christophe Bouvet - Professor
 Ilona Györi - Marie
 Renée Amzallag - The nurse
 Jérôme Simonin - Vendeur de dynamite
 Laetitia Lemerle - Corrine
 Alexandra Yonnet - Copine blouson
 Caroline Doron - Copine blessée
 Laetitia Giraud - Christiane

References

External links
 
 
 
 
 Cold Water: Dancing on the Ruins an essay by Girish Shambu at the Criterion Collection

1994 films
1990s French-language films
1994 drama films
Films directed by Olivier Assayas
Films with screenplays by Olivier Assayas
French drama films
1990s French films